Flatus lifir  is a series of wall art on a concrete wall located at the base of Esja besides the Reykjavík-Borgarnes portion of Route 1. The original graffiti is believed to have been created in the 1980s but its creator is unknown.

In October 2021, a new version of the wall art was created by Edda Karólína Ævarsdóttir.

References

Graffiti and unauthorised signage